The 1976 Broxbourne Council election was held to elect council members of the Broxbourne Borough Council, the local government authority of the borough of Broxbourne, Hertfordshire, England.

Election results

Results summary 

The second election to Broxbourne Borough Council took place on Thursday 6 May 1976.

This was an "all out" election as a result of significant ward boundary changes since the June 1973 election.

The warding pattern was now of 14 wards each returning 3 Councillors. This meant that the Council had expanded to 42 elected members - an increase of 2 Councillors.

A new ward had been created to cover the Rosedale estate.

This warding pattern was to remain in effect until 1999.

Following this election Borough Councillors would retire in thirds starting from the 1978 election.

The Councillor polling the lowest number of votes in each ward would stand for re-election in 1978. The Councillor who polled the next highest number of votes would stand in 1979 and the Councillor with the highest number of votes would stand in 1980.

This arrangement resulted in an electoral curiosity in Rosedale Ward where 2 of the successful candidates at this election polled exactly the same number of votes.

To determine who would "retire" in 1978 after a 2-year term of office, the successful candidates cut a pack of playing cards with the lowest card "losing"

Councillor Robert Donoghue (Conservative) drew a 6 and Councillor Mark Farrington (Labour) drew a 5.

Accordingly, Councillor Farrington was determined to have been placed 3rd in the election and stood for re-election in 1978 after a 2-year term of office.

The new political balance of the Borough Council was

Conservative 36 seats
Labour 6 seats

Shortly after the election Councillor Dan Hickman (Goffs Oak Ward) left the Conservative Group and sat as an Independent Member resulting in a revised political balance of:

Conservative 35 seats
Labour 6 seats
Independent 1 seat

Ward results

References

Lea Valley Mercury Friday 14 May 1976 edition
Cheshunt & Waltham Telegraph Friday 14 May 1976 edition

1976
1976 English local elections
1970s in Hertfordshire